This is a list of women photographers who were born in the South American country of Argentina or whose works are closely associated with that country.

A
Nora Aslan (born 1947). art photographer and visual artist

B
Delfina Blaquier (born 1980), photographer, fashion entrepreneur and former high jumper

D
Alicia D'Amico (1993–2001), leading professional photographer, interest in feminist issues

F
Sara Facio (born 1932), portrait photographer

H
Annemarie Heinrich (1912–2005), German-born Argentine portrait and nude photographer
Gaby Herbstein (born 1969), published photographer

L
Adriana Lestido (born 1955), black-and-white photographer, documenting woman's place in society

M
Matilde Marín (born 1948), artist working with photography, engraving and video

P
Ana Portnoy (1950–2020), portrait photographer in Spain
Constanza Portnoy (born 1980s), award-winning photographer and photojournalist

R
Romina Ressia (born 1981), fashion and fine art photographer

S
Grete Stern (1904–1999), German-born fine art photographer

T
Susana Thénon (1935–1991), poet, translator, artistic photographer

V
Luciana Val (born 1971), fashion photographer together with Franco Musso
Agustina Vivero (born 1991), photoblogger

Z
Helen Zout (born 1957), known for work relating to the disappearances from 1974 to 1983

See also

 Argentine art
 List of Argentine women artists
 List of women photographers

Photographers
Argentine
Photographers